The Tigre was a 28-gun small ship of the line of the French Royal Navy, constructed by the Dutch shipwright Jan Gron (usually called Jean de Werth in French) at the new state dockyard at Île d'Indret near Nantes. She and her sister Léopard were two-deckers, but with only a few guns on the upper deck.

The Tigre sank off Cap de la Casse, Sardinia on 23 September 1644 while carrying material destined for Djidjelli in Algeria, with 64 men lost out of 122 aboard.

Sources and references 

Nomenclature des Vaisseaux de Louis XIII et de la régence d'Anne d'Autriche, 1610 a 1661. Alain Demerliac (Editions Omega, Nice – 2004).
The Sun King's Vessels (2015) - Jean-Claude Lemineur; English translation by François Fougerat. Editions ANCRE.  
Winfield, Rif and Roberts, Stephen (2017) French Warships in the Age of Sail 1626-1786: Design, Construction, Careers and Fates. Seaforth Publishing. . 

 Vaisseaux de Ligne Français de 1682 à 1780 1

Ships of the line of the French Navy
1640s ships